Preiser may refer to:

 Preiser disease, also known as (idiopathic) avascular necrosis of the scaphoid.
 Peter Preiser, professor of molecular genetics and cell biology at the Nanyang Technological University.
 Graziela Preiser, pattern and textile designer known in Germany for her 1970s designs.